Tomčo Sokolov (born March 1, 1984) is a former Macedonian professional basketball Power forward. in Macedonia.

Professional career
During his career, Sokolov played in Croatia, Portugal, Romania, Russia, Tunisia, Turkey, Slovakia, Bosnia and Herzegovina and Slovenia.

On 18 March 2015, Sokolov has signed with KK Maribor.

References

External links
  at basketball.eurobasket.com
  at basketball.realgm.com
  at proballers.com

Living people
1984 births
Macedonian men's basketball players
Slovenian men's basketball players
Macedonian expatriate basketball people in Croatia
Sportspeople from Strumica
Macedonian expatriate basketball people in Portugal
Macedonian expatriate basketball people in Romania
Macedonian expatriate basketball people in Russia
Macedonian expatriate basketball people in Tunisia
Macedonian expatriate basketball people in Turkey
Macedonian expatriate basketball people in Slovakia
Macedonian expatriate basketball people in Bosnia and Herzegovina
Macedonian expatriate basketball people in Slovenia
Power forwards (basketball)